The True Story of Bananagun is the debut studio album by Australian band Bananagun. It was released on 26 June 2020 and debuted at number 40 on the ARIA Charts.

Critical reception

The True Story of Bananagun was met with "universal acclaim" reviews from critics. At Metacritic, which assigns a weighted average rating out of 100 to reviews from mainstream publications, this release received an average score of 83, based on 9 reviews. Aggregator Album of the Year gave the album 81 out of 100 based on a critical consensus of 10 reviews.

Track listing

Charts

Release history

References

2020 debut albums
Full Time Hobby albums